The Bayer designation Phi Pavonis (φ Pav / φ Pavonis) is shared by two stars, in the constellation Pavo:
φ¹ Pavonis
φ² Pavonis

Pavonis, Phi
Pavo (constellation)